Tore Austad (born 8 April 1935) is a Norwegian politician for the Conservative Party. Born in Skedsmo, Akershus, he received a cand. philol. degree in 1962, and worked as a professor of Norwegian at the University of Chicago from 1964 to 1966. Returning to Norway he worked at various academic institutions, before being elected to the Storting from the county of Vest-Agder in 1977, where he sat for three periods, until 1989.

On 14 October 1981, he was appointed Minister of Education and Church Affairs in the new government of Kåre Willoch. On 8 June 1983, the Conservative Party joined in a coalition with the Christian Democratic Party and the Centre Party, in order to form a majority government. Austad had to resign, and his position was taken over by Kjell Magne Bondevik.

References

1935 births
Living people
Conservative Party (Norway) politicians
Government ministers of Norway
Members of the Storting
University of Chicago faculty
People from Skedsmo
20th-century Norwegian politicians
Ministers of Education of Norway